Àlex Lora Cercós (born September 19, 1979), better known as Alex Lora, is a Spanish film director. His films, marked by complex narratives, have entered hundreds film festivals and received multiple awards and nominations around the world, most notably the two official section of Sundance, the nomination to the Student Academy Awards, both presence at the Berlinale Talent Campus and at the Cannes Short Film Corner, the 3 nominations for the Gaudí Catalan Academy Awards, and the nomination and the prize at the New York Emmy Awards.

Early years
Alex Lora was born in Barcelona, Spain and started making film in very young age after his parents bought a video8 handycam. Mr. Lora is a graduate of Barcelona’s Ramon Llull University, where he earned BA and MA degrees in filmmaking and writing and directing for fiction.

Career
In 2011, as a Fulbright Scholar, he completed his two-year MFA in Media Arts Production program at City College of New York, where he was a final nominee for the Student Academy Award. Since his graduation, he has worked internationally as script analyst, editor, cinematographer, writer and director. His short film, Odysseus' Gambit, screened at the Sundance Film Festival in 2012, was nominated to the prestigious Gaudi Awards (Spain) in 2012.

References

External links 

 
 Alex Lora official web site

1979 births
Living people
Film directors from Catalonia